Trelleborgs SS is a Swedish swim team from Trelleborg, Skåne founded in 1922.

Swimmers
Mattias Ohlin
Ida Mattsson
Jonas Tilly

External links
Trelleborgs SS's official homepage 

Swimming clubs in Sweden
Sports clubs established in 1922
1922 establishments in Sweden
Sport in Trelleborg